James Nevin Tait  (27 June 1876 – 1961) was an Australian concert promoter and film producer born in Castlemaine, Victoria who often collaborated with his brothers Charles and John.

Nevin Tait was born in Castlemaine, Victoria, the son of John Turnbull Tait (1830–1902), a tailor from Scalloway, Shetland Islands, Scotland, and his English wife Sarah, née Leeming. John Tait migrated to Victoria in 1862 and settled at Castlemaine where he married Sarah. They had nine children: including Charles (1868–1933), John (1871–1955), James Nevin (1876–1961), Edward Joseph (1878–1947) and Frank Samuel (1883–1965) (later Sir Frank). The Taits moved in about 1879 to Richmond, a suburb of Melbourne, Victoria.

He started as a stockbroker before moving into concert promotion and film production. In March 1911, brothers John and Nevin, and Millard Johnson and William Gibson merged their film interests in Amalgamated Pictures. In 1916 he moved to London to represent his brothers.

References

Australian producers
1876 births
1961 deaths
Music promoters
People from Castlemaine, Victoria
People from Richmond, Victoria
Australian people of Scottish descent
Australian people of English descent